Winter Night's Dream is a 1935 German romantic comedy film directed by Géza von Bolváry and starring Magda Schneider, Wolf Albach-Retty, and Richard Romanowsky. While accompanying her employer to a resort, a secretary falls in love with a ski instructor.

It was filmed at the resort town of Garmisch-Partenkirchen in Bavaria. The film's sets were designed by Emil Hasler.

Cast

See also
Frk. Møllers jubilæum (1937)
Julia jubilerar (1938)

References

Bibliography

External links 
 

1935 films
Films of Nazi Germany
German romantic comedy films
1935 romantic comedy films
1930s German-language films
Films directed by Géza von Bolváry
Skiing films
Films set in the Alps
German black-and-white films
1930s German films